The Shilabati River (also known as Shilai) originates near Chak Gopalpur village of Hura block in the Purulia district of the Indian state of West Bengal. It flows in an almost southeasterly direction through the districts of Bankura and Paschim Medinipur. The Shilabati joins the Dwarakeswar near Ghatal and afterwards is known as Rupnarayan. It finally joins the Hooghly River, which empties into the Bay of Bengal.

Course 
The Shilabati River originates near Chak Gopalpur village of Hura block in the Purulia district of the state of West Bengal.

Others 

At source location of Shilabati river, a temple named Maa Shilabati Temple is located. Almost every year the Shilabati causes flooding, particularly in Banka, Khirpai and Ghatal area. There is a small reservoir on the Shilabati near Khatra known as Kadam Dewli Dam where a canal from Mukutmanipur Kangsabati dam meets. Simlapal block town of Bankura district is located on the bank of this river. Every year, a famous Hindu religious fair called 'Ganga Mela of Simlapal' is held at the river front of Simlapal.

Gongoni Danga, a tourist place on the bank of Shilabati river is located in Paschim Medinipur District.

References

Government of West Bengal - Irrigation & Waterways Dept.
Government of West Bengal - Irrigation & Waterways Dept.
Government of West Bengal - Irrigation & Waterways Dept.
Government of West Bengal - Irrigation & Waterways Dept.
Government of West Bengal - Irrigation & Waterways Dept.

Rivers of West Bengal
Rivers of India

External links